Señorita Panamá 2021 was the 55th Señorita Panamá pageant. It selected the national representatives to the Miss Universe, Miss Supranational, and Miss Grand International competitions. This was the sixth edition of the renewed Señorita Panama pageant, under the direction of Cesar Anel Rodríguez, who took charge of the national event in 2016. Twenty nine preliminary contestants were selected from throughout Panama and competed for the crown.

The 2021 edition was held, for the first time, Hotel Whyndham Convention Center, in Panama City on November 7, 2021.

Señorita Panamá 2020 Carmen Isabel Jaramillo Velarde of Panama Este crowned Brenda Smith Lezama of  Panamá Centro  as her successor at the end of the event.

Representatives to Miss International, Miss Supranational and Miss Grand International was also elected. Darelys Santos Domínguez of Panamá Norte crowned Cecilia Del Carmen Medina of  Casco Antiguo as Miss Supranational Panamá 2022 and Katie Nairobi Caicedo Richards of Panamá Centro crowned Katheryn Giselle Yejas Riaño of Taboga as Miss Grand International Panamá 2022.

Brenda Smith Lezama competed Miss Universe 2021, the 70th Miss Universe pageant, made on 12 December 2021 in Eilat, Israel and where he managed to be part of the 16 finalists. Miss Supranational Panama represented Panama in Miss Supranational 2022, while Miss Grand Panama was supposed to represent Panama in Miss Grand International 2022, but the organization lost the franchise.

On 26 November, the Señorita Panamá Organization announced Ivis Nicole Snyder as the Señorita Panamá for 2022 for represented her country at the Miss International 2022 pageant after the organization lost the right of Miss Universe pageant and succeeded outgoing Señorita Panamá 2021 Brenda Smith Lezama.

Results

Placements

§ – Fan Vote winner

Special awards

Special guests
Miss International 2006, TV host, journalist, radio host, model Daniela di Giacomo of Venezuela served as a judge during the finals.

Costume selection
Held on November 5, the Gala Viva Panama was the election for the Best National Costume. In this competition, the contestants were not evaluated, only the costumes. 

The event showcased the creative work of Panamanian designers and also selected the costume for Panama at Miss Universe 2021. Some costumes were also elected to represent Panama in other beauty contests like Miss Supranational and Miss Grand International.

Preliminary competition
A preliminary competition was held on 5 November 2021 at Hotel Whyndham Convention Center.  The 29 contestants were scored in the categories of swimsuit, talent and overall beauty.  These scores will carry over to the finals to be held on November 7.
Personal Interview: Three days before the finals, the 30 contestants faced the panel of judges for personal interviews.

Judges
 José Castro - Beauty pageant expert. (Puerto Rico)
 Sugeilin Cabrera - Businesswoman. (Panamá)
 José Alberto Sosa - Artistic director. (Panamá)
 Ana Lucia Tejeira - Reina Hispanoamericana Panamá 2021. (Panamá)
 Martin Pereira - Businessman. 
 Daniela di Giacomo - Miss International 2006, TV host, journalist, radio host and model. (Venezuela)
 Jonny Guzman - Dentist. (Panamá)
 Yorbriele Ninoska Vásquez Álvarez - Miss Earth Venezuela 2017. (Venezuela)
 José Luis  Rodriguez - Beauty pageant expert. (Puerto Rico)
 Ingrid Vargas - Dentist.
 Yorman Barrios - Beauty pageant expert. (Venezuela)

Contestants 
These are the competitors who have been selected this year.

References

External links
Panamá 2021 official website

Señorita Panamá
Panama
2021 in Panama